Leyzer Volf (Yiddish: לייזער וואָלף; ; born Eliezer Mekler; 1910, in Šnipiškės, Vilnius – April 1943, in Shakhrisabz) was a Yiddish poet and writer of the Yung-Vilne movement, best remembered for his poems Black Pearls (1939), Lyric and satire (1940), and Brown Beast (1943).

Biography 
Volf's father was a house painter and his mother was a housewife. He was the fourth child in his family. He was sent to cheder at age four, but quickly left after being shocked by the way the rabbi treated the children, after which he was taught privately at home by a melamed. Later on he would study at a secular Jewish folk school in Vilnius and attend a youth camp for weak children; throughout this period he kept a large distance from other children and did not have many friends. Already in school he was considered to be an excellent writer and an avid reader.

References 

1910 births
1943 deaths
Soviet male writers
Deaths by starvation
Jewish poets